Rainer Kepplinger (born 19 August 1997) is an Austrian professional racing cyclist, who currently rides for UCI WorldTeam .

Career
At the UCI Esports World Championships Kepplinger rode in the elite road race for Austria, he got into the early break but was caught on the final climb by the peloton, he still managed to finish seventh. Kepplinger's first victory came from winning the Kirschblütenrennen (National event) in a two-man sprint to the line with Matthias Reutimann. Kepplinger attacked solo with 30 km to go but Reutimann was able to catch up and pair finished 54 seconds ahead of the chasers.
In June 2022 at the Oberösterreich Rundfahrt he won the final stage ahead of defending champion Alexis Guérin securing his first overall victory in a race. In late July a criterium was held the Altstadtcriterium which Geraint Thomas won, Kepplinger finished 2 seconds behind Thomas in seventh place.
On 12 August 2022 it was announced that Kepplinger would join UCI WorldTeam  on a three-year contract from 2023.

Major results
Sources:
2021
 5th Time trial, National Road Championships
2022
 1st  Overall Oberösterreich Rundfahrt
1st Stage 3
 2nd Overall Tour of Malopolska
 2nd Time trial, National Road Championships
 5th Overall Belgrade Banjaluka
 7th UCI Esports World Championships

References

External links

1997 births
Living people
Austrian male cyclists
Austrian male rowers
21st-century Austrian people